The 1933–34 Toronto Maple Leafs season was Toronto's 17th season in the National Hockey League (NHL).

Offseason

Regular season

Final standings

Record vs. opponents

Schedule and results

Playoffs

Player statistics

Regular season
Scoring

Goaltending

Playoffs
Toronto would face Detroit WilRed Wings and goalie Wilf Cude in series A of the Playoffs.  
Game #1 Detroit 2 Toronto 1, #2 Detroit 6 Toronto 3, #3 Toronto 3 Detroit 1, #4Toronto 5 Detroit 1, #5 Detroit 1 Toronto 0. Cude faced 43, 53, 35, 30, and 15 shots for a save % of .932 and gaa of 2.38. Hainsworth faced 31, 28, 23, 15, and 22 shots for a save % of .908 and a gaa of 2.19.  Cude faced an average of 35.2 shots per game, while Hainsworth faced 23.8 shots per game. ;Scoring

Goaltending

Playoffs
The Maple Leafs met the Detroit Red Wings in the second round in a best of five series and lost 3–2.

Transactions
October 1, 1933: Acquired George Hainsworth from the Montreal Canadiens for Lorne Chabot
October 4, 1933: Acquired Hec Kilrea from the Ottawa Senators for Bob Gracie and $10,000
November 13, 1933: Traded Fred Robertson to the Detroit Red Wings for $6,500
December 9, 1933: Loaned Benny Grant to the New York Americans
December 12, 1933: Loaned Dave Downie from the Syracuse Stars of the IHL
January 2, 1934: Loaned Flash Hollett to the Ottawa Senators for the remainder of the season
March 1, 1934: Signed Free Agent Bill Shill
April 11, 1934: Traded Alex Levinsky to the New York Rangers for cash

See also
1933–34 NHL season

References

Toronto Maple Leafs seasons
Toronto
Toronto